Bruce Campbell (born May 25, 1988) is a former American football offensive tackle. He was drafted by the Oakland Raiders in the fourth round of the 2010 NFL Draft. He played college football at Maryland. He is the son of the late former Providence College basketball great Bruce "Soup" Campbell. 

He has also been a member of the Carolina Panthers, New York Jets, Toronto Argonauts, and Saskatchewan Roughriders.

Early years
Campbell originally attended Hyde Leadership School in New Haven, Connecticut, where he was a four-year letterman and never missed a game during his career. He played defensive end all four years and started at that spot and offensive tackle his last two years. Campbell had 50 tackles, including 4.5 quarterback sacks, while blocking two PATs and one punt as a junior, and recorded 70 tackles, including six sacks, two forced fumbles and one fumble recovery his senior season in 2005. He subsequently earned PrepStar All-American honors.

Considered a four-star recruit by Rivals.com, Campbell was ranked as the No. 17 offensive tackle prospect in 2006. He chose Maryland over Michigan State, Nebraska, and Virginia. However, before enrolling at Maryland, Campbell spent a preparation year at Hargrave Military Academy.

College career
In his true freshman season at Maryland in 2007, Campbell appeared in five games at left tackle, including one start against Clemson when injuries hit the Terrapins' offensive line.

Campbell played in all 13 games in 2008, and saw action as a reserve at left tackle in the first six contests before starting at that spot the last seven. He was part of an offensive line that enabled Da'Rel Scott (1,133) to become the seventh Terp back, and first since Chris Downs in 2002, to gain over 1,000 rushing yards. In week 7 of the season, Campbell earned ACC Lineman of the Week honors for his performance against Wake Forest.

Professional career
On December 18, 2009, Campbell announced his decision to enter the 2010 NFL Draft.

Oakland Raiders
Campbell was selected by the Oakland Raiders in the fourth round (106th overall) of the 2010 NFL Draft, despite many draft analysts, such as Mel Kiper Jr. and Scott Wright, who thought he would be selected in the top 10. He was reunited with former Maryland teammate Darrius Heyward-Bey. Before training camp started former head coach Tom Cable moved Campbell inside to play right guard on the Raiders' offensive line. On July 21, 2011, Campbell confirmed that he would be moving back outside to play his native position offensive tackle on the Raiders' offensive line under former head coach Hue Jackson's power blocking scheme. He never started any of his 14 games with Oakland.

Carolina Panthers
Campbell was acquired by the Carolina Panthers on March 30, 2012 in a trade that sent RB Mike Goodson to the Oakland Raiders. On August 24, 2013, he was waived/injured by the Panthers.

Washington Redskins
On March 12, 2014, Campbell signed a one-year deal with the Washington Redskins. However, his deal was voided on March 13, 2014 after he failed his team physical.

New York Jets
The New York Jets signed Campbell on August 5, 2014. He was released on August 23, 2014.

Toronto Argonauts
On March 20, 2015, Campbell signed with the Toronto Argonauts of the Canadian Football League.

Saskatchewan Roughriders
Campbell was acquired by the Saskatchewan Roughriders of the Canadian Football League via a trade with the Toronto Argonauts on February 10, 2016, only to be soon followed by his retirement from the CFL on May 2, 2016. He was released on February 14, 2017. When Campbell regained the urge to play football, he re-signed with the Roughriders on June 23, 2017. On August 13, 2017, Campbell made his debut with Saskatchewan starting at left tackle. He was released on February 13, 2018.

References

External links
Toronto Argonauts bio
Maryland Terrapins bio
Carolina Panthers bio
Oakland Raiders bio

1988 births
Living people
People from Hamden, Connecticut
Players of American football from Connecticut
American football offensive tackles
American football offensive guards
Canadian football offensive linemen
American players of Canadian football
Maryland Terrapins football players
Oakland Raiders players
Carolina Panthers players
New York Jets players
Sportspeople from New Haven County, Connecticut
Toronto Argonauts players
Saskatchewan Roughriders players